The 2019 Atlantic Coast Conference men's soccer tournament was the 33rd edition of the ACC Men's Soccer Tournament. The tournament decided the Atlantic Coast Conference champion and guaranteed representative into the 2019 NCAA Division I Men's Soccer Tournament. The final was played at Sahlen's Stadium in Cary, NC.

The defending champions were the Louisville Cardinals. Louisville was unable to defend its crown, losing to Virginia Tech in the first round.  The Virginia Cavaliers claimed their eleventh title by beating Clemson in the final.

Qualification 

All twelve teams in the Atlantic Coast Conference earned a berth into the ACC Tournament. The top 4 seeds received first round byes and hosted the winner of a first round game.  All rounds, with the exception of the final were held at the higher seed's home field.  Seeding is determined by regular season conference record.

Bracket 
*Note: Home team listed first.  Rankings shown are ACC Tournament Seeds.

Schedule

First round

Quarterfinals

Semifinals

Finals

Statistics

Goalscorers
2 Goals
  James Brighton – Clemson
  Nathaniel Crofts – Virginia
  Edward Kizza – Pittsburgh
  Daniel Pereira – Virginia Tech

1 Goal

  Robin Afamefuna – Virginia
  Luther Archimède – Syracuse
  Ian Aschieris – Notre Dame
  George Asomani – NC State
  Joe Bell – Virginia
  Joey DeZart – Wake Forest
  Pepe Garcia – NC State
  Axel Gunnarsson – Virginia
  Cabrel Happi Kamseu – Virginia
  Kyle Holcomb – Wake Forest
  Jon Ingason – Virginia Tech
  James Kasak – Virginia Tech
  Philip Mayaka – Clemson
  Malick Mbaye – Clemson
  Kuda Muskwe – NC State
  Daniele Proch – Duke
  Mohamed Seye – Clemson
  Stefan Sigurdarson – Boston College

Own Goals
 Boston College (team) against Notre Dame

All-Tournament team 

MVP in Bold

See also 
 Atlantic Coast Conference
 2019 Atlantic Coast Conference men's soccer season
 2019 NCAA Division I men's soccer season
 2019 NCAA Division I men's soccer tournament

References 

ACC Men's Soccer Tournament
Tournament
ACC Men's Soccer Tournament